Stapleton  may refer to:

Places

Australia
Stapleton Island, Queensland
Stapleton, Northern Territory

United Kingdom
Stapleton, Bristol
Stapleton, Cumbria
Stapleton, Herefordshire
Stapleton, Leicestershire
Stapleton, Richmondshire, North Yorkshire
Stapleton, Selby, North Yorkshire
Stapleton, Shropshire
Stapleton, Somerset, a location

United States
Stapleton, Alabama
Stapleton, Georgia
Stapleton, Nebraska
Stapleton, Staten Island, a neighborhood in New York City
Stapleton (Staten Island Railway station)
Central Park, Denver, a neighborhood in Denver, Colorado; formerly known as Stapleton
Stapleton International Airport, the former airport serving Denver, Colorado, now being redeveloped as a master-planned New Urbanist community

Other uses
 Stapleton (surname), including a list of people and characters with the name
Stapleton (band), a rock band from Glasgow